Kelab Bolasepak Staff Universiti Sains Malaysia (KBSUSM) or USM Staff FC or USM FC was a Malaysia football club team, formerly competing in Malaysia Premier League.

The team was under the jurisdiction of Universiti Sains Malaysia, a Malaysian public university based in Georgetown, Penang.

History
KBSUSM was selected to the 2010 Malaysia Premier League based on the team's excellent performance in FAM Cup 2009, where they finished third in the league.

In the 2010 Malaysia Premier League, KBSUSM was officially named as Pulau Pinang, Kepala Batas, Staf USM. This differs from when KBSUSM was in 2009 FAM Cup. In 2009 KBSUSM were named officially as Pulau Pinang, Kelab Bolasepak Staf Universiti Sains Malaysia.

For the 2011 Malaysia Premier League, they were officially named as Pulau Pinang, Kelab Bolasepak USM.

This USM team were one of two 'university' teams participating in eight-team FAM Cup (held for the first time in league format). While its counterpart UiTM FC have students as their line-ups, USM have their own staff as line-ups.

USM FC pulled out of the 2013 Malaysia Premier League, despite finishing the previous season in sixth place. The club's management cited financial difficulties as the reason for the decision.

Achievements

Transfers
For recent transfers, see List of Malaysian football transfers 2012

Officials
 Manager:
 Assistant manager:
 Head coach:
 Assistant coach:
 Assistant coach:
 Goalkeeping coach:
 Physical & Fitness Coach:
 Doctor:
 Physiotherapist:
 Kitman:

Managers

Coaches

2010 season results

References

External links
 Malaysia Super League
 USMFC
 Kelab Penyokong USM FC
 USM FC Soccerway

Football clubs in Malaysia
University and college association football clubs
2008 establishments in Malaysia
Universiti Sains Malaysia